Joe Renzetti (
is an American film composer and session musician. He scores for films and television, and composes works for orchestra, chamber groups, and solo artists.

Career

Born in Philadelphia, Renzetti began his career as a result of Dick Clark and American Bandstand, originating from Philly, Cameo-Parkway records came into existence. Renzetti became Cameo Records' house guitarist, and played on the hits "Let's Twist Again", Dee Dee Sharp's "Mashed Potato Time", "South Street", The "Limbo Rock", "Palisades Park", and "Tallahassee Lassie". Joe Renzetti was Gamble and Huff's first arranger, one of the originators of "The Sound Of Philadelphia".

Fascinated by the advances in recording technology, and the profession of arranging for records Renzetti moved his career to New York. There he arranged "Sunny" by Bobby Hebb, "98.6" by Keith, "Apples, Peaches, Pumpkin Pie" by Jay & the Techniques, and "Mandy" by Barry Manilow.

Renzetti moved to Hollywood and was called to arrange the music for the 1978 film The Buddy Holly Story, which garnered him an Academy Award for Best Adaptation Score.

Filmography 

 The Buddy Holly Story (1978)
 Elvis (1979)
 Fatso (1980)
 The Exterminator (1980)
 Dead & Buried (1981)
 Under the Rainbow (1981)
 Vice Squad (1982)
 Wanted: Dead or Alive (1986)
 Poltergeist III (1988)
 Child's Play (1988)
 Lisa (1989)
 Basket Case 2 (1990)
 Frankenhooker (1990)
 Basket Case 3: The Progeny (1991)

List of selected works
"Waltz" for Blues-Harmonica and Orchestra
"Echo" for Classical Guitar Quartet
"On a Chord By Kessel" for Classical Guitar Quartet
"Holiday Furioso" Scherzo for Orchestra
"String Quartet in F" - "American"
"First Chair" A Concerto for Orchestra
"The 1912 Overture" for Jazz Piano solo and Orchestra
"Concerto for Three Guitars and Orchestra"
"Blues, for me?"

Partial list of arranged records
"Sunny" (composer Bobby Hebb's recording) 
"Mandy" (Barry Manilow's version of "Brandy")
"98.6" (Keith)
"Apples, Peaches, Pumpkin Pie" (Jay & the Techniques)

Awards
Academy Award for Best Adaptation Score – The Buddy Holly Story (1978)
 Gold Record for "Sunny" by Bobby Hebb
 Gold Record for "Mandy" by Barry Manilow
 Nomination for a Golden Raspberry Award for Worst Musical Score – Under the Rainbow (1981)

References

External links
 Official website

1941 births
Living people
American film score composers
American male film score composers
American session musicians
Best Original Music Score Academy Award winners
Musicians from Philadelphia
Varèse Sarabande Records artists
La-La Land Records artists